The Sud-Ouest S.O.30 Bretagne was a 1940s French airliner built by Sud-Ouest.

Design and development
The Bretagne (Engl. "Brittany") was designed by a group of designers and engineers who were based at Cannes from May 1941 following the invasion of France. The design was for a medium capacity civil transport, a twin-engined mid-wing cantilever all-metal monoplane. The prototype (designated the S.O.30N) first flew on 26 February 1945.

Operational history
The initial production version was designated the S.O.30P Bretagne with two versions with different engines. The aircraft operated with a crew of five and could carry between 30 and 43 passengers. A cargo version (the S.O.30C) was produced, with a revised interior and strengthened floor and large cargo door. The aircraft was operated as an airliner, but mainly by the French military forces as a medium transport.

Some aircraft were fitted with two underwing Turbomeca Palas turbojet engines for auxiliary power. Other aircraft were used for engine-trials fitted with the SNECMA Atar 101 and licence-built Rolls-Royce Nene turbojets.

Variants
S.O.30N Tailwheel undercarriage prototype, c/n 01 built after the 1940 armistice and stored till after the war. The second S.O.30R c/n 02 was built in 1946 and later converted to the S.O.30 Nene, jet powered airliner test-bed.
S.O.30R Bellatrix Two prototypes of the nosewheel undercarriage production model.
S.O.30Ccargo version, one built with belly loading hatches.
S.O.30P-1production version with Pratt & Whitney R-2800-B43 engines.
S.O.30P-2production version with Pratt & Whitney R-2800-CA13 engines.
S.O.30 NeneOne aircraft converted from S.O.30R c/n 02 for use as a testbed, powered by two Rolls-Royce Nenes.

Operators

Military operators

French Air Force
French Navy

Civil operators

Air Algérie

Aigle Azur
Air France
COSARA based in French Indo-China

Iranian Airways

Air Maroc

Specifications (S.O.30P-2)

See also

References

Notes

Bibliography
 Bridgeman, Leonard. Jane's All The World's Aircraft 1953–54. London: Jane's All The World's Aircraft Publishing Company, 1953.

 Stroud, John. European Transport Aircraft since 1910. London: Putnam, 1966.
 The Illustrated Encyclopedia of Aircraft (Part Work 1982-1985). London: Orbis Publishing, 1985.

Further reading

1940s French airliners
1940s French military transport aircraft
Bretagne
Mid-wing aircraft
Aircraft first flown in 1945
Twin piston-engined tractor aircraft